Prešov (Rusyn and Ukrainian: Пряшів) is a city in Eastern Slovakia. It is the seat of administrative Prešov Region and Šariš, as well as the historic Sáros County of the Kingdom of Hungary. With a population of approximately 90,000 for the city, and in total about 110,000 with the metropolitan area, it is the third-largest city in Slovakia. It belongs to the Košice-Prešov agglomeration and is the natural cultural, economic, transport and administrative center of the Šariš region. It lends its name to the Eperjes-Tokaj Hill-Chain which was considered as the geographic entity on the first map of Hungary from 1528. There are many tourist attractions in Prešov such as castles (e.g. Šariš Castle), pools and the old town.

Etymology
The first written mention is from 1247. The theory was questioned in the 1940s and newer Slovak works suggest a derivation from Slavic personal name Preš/Prešä and its later phonetic adaptation (introduction of  e before the initial consonant group and removal of the suffix, the original form then ceased to exist). Strawberries depicted on the coat of arms of Prešov are not necessarily determinative, the Latin name  (strawberry city) is only a modern translation.

Characteristics
The old town is a showcase of Baroque, Rococo and Gothic architecture. The historical center is lined with buildings built in these styles. In the suburbs, however, the Soviet influence is clearly evident through the massive concrete panel buildings (paneláky) of the housing estates (sídliska) and the Sekčov district. More Soviet-style architecture is seen in the government buildings near the city center.

Significant industries in the city include mechanical and electrical engineering companies and the clothing industry. Solivary, the only salt mining and processing company in Slovakia, also operates in the city. The city is a seat of a Greek Catholic metropolitan see and of the primate of the autocephalous Orthodox Church of the Czech Lands and Slovakia.

Many concerts, operas, operettas and stage plays are performed at the new building of the Jonáš Záborský Theatre (Divadlo Jonáša Záborského), as well as at the older theatre premises.

The city and the region were contenders for European Capital of Culture 2013. The nearby city of Košice was chosen.

Topography 
Prešov lies in the eastern part of Slovakia at the confluence of the rivers Torysa and Sekčov in the Košice Basin. It is surrounded by Slanské vrchy from the east and Šarišská vrchovina from the west. Roads I / 18 (Poprad - Michalovce), I / 68 (direction Stará Ľubovňa), I / 20 (direction Košice) intersect in the town and the south-western connection of the D1 motorway (Poprad - Košice) is being built. The Košice - Muszyna railway line leads through Prešov, to which the lines to Humenné and Bardejov connect.

City Districts 

Self-governing city districts. Territorial districts of self-governing city districts:

 Circuit number 1: Sídlisko III, Sídlisko Mladosť, Rúrky
 Circuit number 2: Sídlisko II, Kalvária, pod Kamennou baňou, pod Wilecovou hôrkou, Borkút, Vydumanec, Kvašná voda, Cemjata
 Circuit number 3: north of the city, Mier, Šidlovec, Dúbrava, Surdok, Kúty, Širpo, Nižná Šebastová
 Circuit number 4: city center – Staré mesto, Táborisko, Sídlisko Duklianskych hrdinov
 Circuit number 5: Solivar, Soľná Baňa, Šváby, Delňa, Tichá Dolina
 Circuit number 5.5: Šimonov
 Circuit number 6: southern part of the housing project Sekčov – building 1 – 4
 Circuit number 7: northern part of the housing project Sekčov – building 5 – 7, Šalgovík

Cadastral city district: Prešov, Nižná Šebastová, Solivar, Šalgovík, Cemjata

Other districts: Delňa, Dúbrava, Kalvária, Rúrky, Soľná Baňa, Šarišské Lúky, Širpo, Šidlovec, Táborisko, Teľov, Vydumanec, Borkút, Kúty, Surdok

Housing estates: Duklianskych hrdinov, Mier, Mladosť, Sekčov, Sídlisko II, Sídlisko III, Šváby

Previous city districts: Haniska (1970 – 1990), Ľubotice (1970 – 1990), Šarišské Lúky (1970 – 1990, since 1990 it's a part of the village Ľubotice)

In the last few few years and today, the construction of new residential areas and satellite towns in Prešov is being realized, especially in the district Šidlovec, Solivar, Šalgovík, Tichá dolina and Surdok.

Watercourses 
 Torysa with tributaries:
 Šidlovský potok (L)
 Vydumanec (R)
 Malkovský potok (R)
 Sekčov (L)
 Delňa (L)
 Continues to Sekčov:
 Šebastovka (L)
 Ľubotický potok (L)
 Šalgovícky potok (L)
 Soľný potok (L)
 Baracký potok (R)

History
Habitation in the area around Prešov dates as far back as the Paleolithic period. The oldest discovered tools and mammoth bones are 28,000 years old. Continuous settlement dates back to the 8th century.

After the Mongol invasion in 1241, King Béla IV of Hungary invited German colonists to fill the gaps in population. Prešov became a German-speaking settlement, related to the Zipser German and Carpathian German areas, and was elevated to the rank of a royal free town in 1347 by Louis the Great.

In 1412, Prešov helped to create the Pentapolitana, the league of five towns, a trading group. The first record of a school dates from 1429. After the collapse of the old Kingdom of Hungary after the Ottoman invasion of 1526, Prešov became a border city and changed hands several times between two usually rivalrous domains, Habsburg Royal Hungary and Hungarian states normally backed by the Ottomans: the Eastern Hungarian Kingdom, the Principality of Transylvania, and the Principality of Upper Hungary.

Still, Prešov went through an economic boom thanks to trade with the Polish–Lithuanian Commonwealth. In the 16th century it brought in grape vines from the nearby Tokaj wine region, and was home to German-Hungarian, Polish and Greek wine merchants. Some of the first books on Tokaj wine were written in German in Prešov.

In 1572, salt mining began in Solivar (at that time a nearby town, now part of Prešov).

Antun Vrančić, a Croatian prelate, writer, diplomat and Archbishop of Esztergom, died in Prešov in 1573.

Prešov was prominent in the Protestant Reformation. It was at the front line in the 1604–1606 Bocskai Uprising, when Imperial Army commander Giorgio Basta retreated to the town after failing to take Košice from the Protestant rebels.

In 1647 the Habsburgs designated it the capital of Sáros county. In late January 1657, Transylvanian Prince George II Rákóczi, a Protestant, invaded Poland with army of some 25,000 which crossed the Carpathians on the road from Prešov to Krosno.

Wolfgang Schustel, a Lutheran reformer during the Reformation, who adopted an uncompromising position on public piety worked in Prešov and other towns. In 1667, the important Evangelical Lutheran College of Eperjes was established by Lutherans in the town.

Imre Thököly, the Protestant Hungarian rebel and Ottoman ally studied at the Protestant college here. In 1685 he was defeated here by the Habsburg at the Battle of Eperjes. In 1687 twenty-four prominent citizens and noblemen were executed, under a tribunal instituted by the Austrian general Antonio Caraffa, for supporting the uprising of Imre Thököly:

At the beginning of the 18th century, the population was decimated by the Bubonic plague and fires and was reduced to a mere 2,000 inhabitants. By the second half of the century, however, the town had recovered; crafts and trade improved, and new factories were built. In 1752 the salt mine in Solivar was flooded. Since then salt has been extracted from salt brine through boiling.

The English author John Paget visited Presov and describes it in his 1839 book Hungary and Transylvania. In 1870 the first railway line was built, connecting the town to Košice. At the end of the 19th century, the town introduced electricity, telephone, telegraph and a sewage systems. In 1887 fire destroyed a large part of the town.

In 1918, Czechoslovak troops began occupying Eastern Slovakia, along with Prešov. On 16 June 1919, Hungarian troops entered the city and the very brief Slovak Soviet Republic was declared here with the support of the Hungarian Soviet Republic. The short-lived republic collapsed in 7 July 1919 and Czechoslovak troops re-entered Prešov. In 1920, after the Treaty of Trianon, Prešov definitively became part of the newly created Czechoslovakia. During World War II, the nearby town of Košice again became part of the Kingdom of Hungary as a result of the First Vienna Award. As a result, many institutions moved from Košice to Prešov, thus increasing the town's importance. In 1944, a professional Slovak Theatre was established in Prešov. The city is a site in the Holocaust:

About two thousand Jews were deported from Prešov to the Dęblin–Irena Ghetto in May 1942. Only a few dozen survived.

On 19 January 1945 Prešov was taken by Soviet troops of the 1st Guards Army. After 1948, during the Communist era in Czechoslovakia, Prešov became an industrial center. Due to World War II, Prešov lost the majority of its Jewish population. Nonetheless, population of the city increased rapidly from 28,000 in 1950 to 52,000 in 1970 and 89,000 in 1990.

Overview of significant historical events 

 4th – 5th century – arrival of Slavs to the territory of Prešov
 1247 – the first written mention of Prešov
 1299 – granting of city rights by King Andrew III of Hungary
 1412 (the 80s of the 15th century) – Prešov belongs to Pentapolitana (community of 5 royal cities - Prešov, Košice, Bardejov, Levoča, Sabinov)
 1429 – the first mention of a town school in Prešov
 1453 – the first coat of arms of Prešov
 1455 – granting the right of the city of Prešov to organize an annual three-day fair by King Ladislaus the Posthumous
 1502 – 1505 – beginning of the construction of the Co-Cathedral of St. Nicholas
 1647 – sanctification of the Evangelical Church of the Augsburg Confession of the Holy Trinity Church
 1667 – College in Prešov, Evangelical Educational Center of Upper Hungary, National Cultural Monument
 1687 – Caraffa's slaughterhouse, 24 executed townspeople
 1703 – the beginning of the most powerful anti-Habsburg uprising led by Francis II. Rákocim
 The end of the 18th century – arrival of the first Jews in Prešov
 1816 – Prešov becomes the seat of an independent Greek Catholic diocese
 1848 – construction of the 1st Jewish synagogue
 1886, 1887 – big devastating fires affect Prešov
 November 1, 1918 – in the afternoon, 41 soldiers and 2 civilians were executed in the city square. This event is also known as the Prešov Uprising (Prešovská vzbura)
 16 June 1919 – from the balcony of the town hall the Slovenská Soviet Republic (SSR) was declared
 1923 – 1924 – construction of the Art Nouveau building of Bosáková bank
 December 20, 1944 - the bombing of the city is reminiscent of a small monument on Konštantínova Street
 January 19, 1945 – liberation of Prešov by the Red Army, the end of World War II is reminiscent of the Liberators Memorial
 1950 – the center becomes a city monument reserve
 1972 – The Solivary is becoming a national cultural monument
 July 2, 1995 – Pope John Paul II visited Prešov
 2021 – Pope Francis visited Prešov

The highest representatives of the city 
By granting city privileges in 1299, the people of Prešov gained the right to elect their vogt. Such a vogt embodied the highest executive and judicial power in the city. He was elected among the esteemed burghers, usually for one year. The first vogt in the city of Prešov, whose name has been preserved, was Hanus called Ogh, who is mentioned in historical sources as early as 1314. However, historians have not been able to complete the complete list of all the vogts of Prešov until from 1497. For the first time, a woman became the highest representative of Prešov in 2014, when Andrea Turčanová became the winner of the election. In the elections of 2018, she strengthened her position and won the elections to the mayor of Prešov.

Military 
Prešov already had an important geographical position in the Middle Ages, because it was located at the crossroads of trade routes and also belonged to the important defense system of the emerging Hungarian state. The beginnings of the army in Prešov date back to this area, as Hungarian tribes and their allies, which were military-guard groups of Asian ethnic groups, came to these areas to establish guard settlements and fortresses to defend the emerging Kingdom of Hungary from enemy attacks. To this day, the names of the nearby hills Veľká and Lysá stráž have been preserved.

The city had its own garrison probably since 1374, when it was given the right to build defensive walls with bastions and towers by King Louis I. The importance of the military garrison certainly increased because the city of Prešov became a free royal town in the 14th century. At the end of the 16th century, during the 15-year war with Turkey, the city had to sustain a large imperial army. From 1604, when the first of a number of anti-Habsburg uprisings of the Hungarian estates broke out, until 1710, when the city capitulated to a strong Habsburg army, Prešov was besieged many times by various insurgent troops, even by imperial troops. For example: Bocskai uprising, General Bast's troops, Juraj I. Rákoci's insurgents, Veshelini's conspiracy, Kuruk's insurgents, Tököli's uprising, General Caraffa's Prešov slaughterhouses and the insurgents led by Francis II. Rákocim. Prešov then flourished until 1848, because it did not experience any war.

The revolutionary years of 1848–49 pulled not only the free royal city of Prešov, but the whole country into the whirlwind of events. Volunteer towns. Due to its strategic location, Prešov experienced several changes of military forces during this period. For example, General Schlick's imperial army was replaced by Görgey's Hungarian army, which was soon replaced by Austrian and Slovak volunteer units, which in turn were replaced by imperial soldiers together with the Russian army. The fact that the military importance of Prešov continued to grow is also evidenced by the data from the census of 1900, when out of 14,447 inhabitants of Prešov there were up to 1,349 soldiers. The local military garrison consisted of several units of the joint army and militia, the largest of which was the 67th Imperial and Royal Infantry Regiment. The hardships of World War I and especially its end tragically affected the life of Prešov, because on November 1, 1918, under the influence of the revolution in Budapest, soldiers of the 67th Regiment and some other smaller units in Prešov refused to obey their commanders and looted some shops in Prešov. After the arrival of military reinforcements, the insurgents were arrested and despite the fact that there were no casualties during the riots, the statistical court sentenced the participants in the uprising to death. On the same day, November 1, 1918, 41 soldiers and 2 civilians were executed in the square. This event is also known as the Prešov Uprising. The bombing of the city on December 20, 1944, was also devastating for the city of Prešov.

From July 4, 1945, shortly after the end of World War II, military units in the territory of Czechoslovakia were reorganized according to the model of the Red Army. Since then, the following military headquarters have been located in the city of Prešov: infantry regiment headquarters, rifle division headquarters, tank division headquarters, motorized rifle division headquarters, mechanized division headquarters, army corps headquarters, mechanized brigade headquarters.

From 1918 to 2019, these soldiers, who were born in Prešov, brigadier general František Bartko, major general Vojtech Gejza Danielovič, lieutenant general Alexander Mucha, Brigadier General Ing. Karol Navrátil, brigadier general Ing. Ivan Pach, major general Emil Perko, major general Jozef Zadžora.

Geography

It is located in the north-eastern Slovakia, at the northern reaches of the Košice Basin, at the confluence of the Torysa River with its tributary Sekčov. Mountain ranges nearby include Slanské vrchy (south-east), Šarišská vrchovina (south-west), Bachureň (west) and Čergov (north).

Climate
Prešov has a warm humid continental climate, bordering an oceanic climate. Prešov has four distinct seasons and is characterized by a significant variation between somewhat warm summers and slightly cold, snowy winters.

Demographics

Historic

In the past, Prešov was a typical multiethnic town where Slovak, Hungarian, German, and Yiddish were spoken.

Before World War II Prešov was a home for a large Jewish population of 4,300 and housed a major Jewish museum. During 1939 and 1940 the Jewish community absorbed a flow of Jewish refugees from German Nazi-occupied Poland, and in 1941 additional deportees from Bratislava. In 1942 a series of deportations of Prešov's Jews to the German Nazi death camps in Poland began. Plaques in the town hall and a memorial in the surviving synagogue record that 2 6,400 Jews were deported from the town under the Tiso government of the First Slovak Republic. Only 716 Jewish survivors were found in the city and its surrounding when it was liberated by the Soviet Red Army in January 1945.

Modern

According to the 2011 census, Prešov had 91 782 inhabitants, 81.14% declared Slovak nationality, 1.70% Romani, 1.59% Rusyn, 0,7% Ukrainian, 0.48% Czech, 0.14% Hungarian, 13.8% did not declare any nationality.

Religion

Roman Catholic Church 
Prešov is the seat of the Roman Co-Cathedral of St. Nicholas. The city is part of the metropolitan Košice Archdiocese.

Greek Catholic Church 
Prešov is the seat of the Slovak Greek Catholic metropolis and the Prešov Greek Catholic Archeparchy, which was founded on November 3, 1815, by Emperor Francis II.

Orthodox Church 
The Prešov Orthodox Diocese was established after World War II by the division of the Mukachevo-Prešov Orthodox Diocese. The Cathedral of St. Prince Alexander Nevsky was built between 1946 and 1950 in the traditional Russian style.

Evangelical Church of the Augsburg Confession 
Prešov is also the seat of the diocese of the Evangelical Church of the Augsburg Confession in Slovakia.

Religious education 
There are two theological faculties in the city - the Greek Catholic Theological Faculty and the Orthodox Theological Faculty. Both are part of the University of Prešov.

Religious make-up 
The religious make-up was 55.8% Roman Catholics, 12.44% people with no religious affiliation, 8.15% Greek Catholics, 4.05% Lutherans, 1.55% Orthodox, 17.16% did not declare any religious affiliation. On the contrary, we see an increase in the number of atheists, Greek Catholics and the unidentified.

Culture

Theaters 

 Alexander Dukhnovych Theater
 Jonas Záborský Theater
 CILILING Children's Theater (www.cililing.sk)
 Babadlo Children's Theater
 DRaK Children's Theater
 Portal Theater
 Theater studio in Hlavná
 Erik Németh Theater
 Prešov National Theater
 Black Eagle Culture and Recreation Park
 Viola - center for art

Museums 

 Regional Museum
 Museum of Ruthenian Culture SNM
 Solivar Museum
 Barkány's collection of Judaica - exposition of the Museum of Jewish Culture in the Prešov Synagogue
 Wine Museum

Galleries 

 Šariš Gallery
 Caraffa Prison Gallery
 Wall Gallery
 Creative Design Gallery
 Atrium Gallery
 J.D Galéria J.L - exterior gallery on Okružná street, showing paintings of historical Prešov

Libraries 

 P. O. Hviezdoslav Library in Prešov
 State Scientific Library Prešov
 University Library of the University of Prešov

Cinemas 

 Scala (former Panorama Cinema)
 Cinemax Max (5 halls)
 Cinemax Novum (8 halls)
 Star OC Eperia (5 halls)
 Garden Cinema
 Prešov Amphitheater

Science 

 Regional Observatory and Planetarium
 Unipolab - science park of the University of Prešov

Music 
Thanks to the lively musical life and the success of Prešov's music production, the city of Prešov has earned the nickname "Slovak Seattle" or "City of Music" long ago, mainly through the media. However, many musicians from Prešov work not only within their hometown or region, but also reap success in the whole of Slovakia, neighboring countries or even Europe.

However, not only the number of mainstream successful musicians contributed to the musical life of the city, in the past and today, but also more or less (un) known groups and musical subcultures, steadily operating in the city foothills (genres: metal, punk, alternative scene, gospel, pop-rock, folk, jazz, country), concert rooms and clubs (Véčko, Bizarre, Christiania, City Club, Stromoradie, Za siedmimi oknami, Wave, Ester rock club, Netopier, Staré Mexico, Insomnia), rock shows of bands with a long tradition (Rock League, over 20 years, Prešov student Liverpool, 6 years, Ladder), but also festivals (Sigortus, Dobrý festival, (t)urbanfest, ImROCK FEST, East Side Music Festival, Festival zlej hudby, Farfest, or Jazz Prešov).

Important events include the Dni mesta Prešov (Days of the City of Prešov), which are held annually on the occasion of the celebrations of the first written mention of the city (as of 2021, 774th anniversary). The celebrations usually include open-air concerts right in the center on Hlavná Street, whereas several guests from the domestic and European alternative scene took turns throughout the years. That includes: Deti Picasso (Russia), Myster Möbius (France/Hungary), Masfél (Hungary), Prague Selection II.; Laura a její tygři (Czech Republic), Srečna Mladina (Slovenia), Squartet (Italy), but also Slovak groups Heľenine Oči, Chiki liki tu-a, Arzén, Mango Molas, Alter Ego, Kapátske chrbáty a Komajota.

Part of the city's celebrations are also side stages, where young bands can also try their luck.

In 2009, the first Prešov film festival. Bastion film festival, was established. The festival takes place on the historic wall behind the Franciscan Church. The organizers are PKO Prešov and Prešov composer and guitarist David Kollar.

After many years, the constant influx and modification of music groups, which are often enforced throughout Slovakia, required documentation, which took place through the Internet database of Prešov bands and performers under the name Frenky's Music Encyclopedia. Historically and currently, the ever-growing database of Prešov musicians is run by Michal Frank, a journalist and editor-in-chief of the Prešov Korzár.

Významní prešovskí hudobníci a kapely:

 Ivan Tásler
 Peha
 Katarína Knechtová
 Groovin’ Heads
 Chiki liki tu-a
 Katka Koščová
 Heľenine oči
 Mloci
 Peter Lipa
 David Kollar
 Hrdza
 Komajota
 Nuda
 Peter Nagy
 Grand Band
 Frown
 Raindown
 Strecha
 AMC Trio
 IMT Smile
 Edo Klena

Buildings 

 State Scientific Library
 Culture and Recreation Park
 Observatory and planetarium
 Fountains and small fountains in Prešov
 New Jonáš Záborský Theater
 Jonáš Záborský Historical Theater
 White House (PSK headquarters)

Historical monuments 

 Cathedral of St. John the Baptist, which houses the remains of the Blessed Martyrs of Prešov bl. Pavel Petr Gojdič and Vasil Hopek and a faithful copy of the Turin Canvas.
 Co-Cathedral of St. Nicholas
 Church of St. Alexander Nevsky
 Bosák's house (bank)
 Caraffa Prison (gallery)
 Florian's Gate
 Gothic gate
 Sculpture of the Immaculate Conception
 Sculpture of St. Roch
 Evangelical College
 Evangelical Church of the Augsburg Confession
 Church of St. Joseph
 Greek Catholic Episcopal Palace
 Rákóczi Palace – the seat of the Regional Museum
 Klobušický Palace - seat of the Regional Court
 Tauth's house
 Weber's house
 De Rossi's House
 Szyrmayi Curia – the seat of the Orthodox Theological Faculty of University of Prešov
 Old town school
 Wierdt House – the seat of the regional monument office
 Prešov Calvary – an important monument from the first half of the 18th century. Construction began in 1721 and was completed around 1752. The construction was led by the Jesuits, who administered the Roman Catholic parish. Calvary consists of 16 baroque chapels and a church in honor of the St. Cross, which is built on the highest point
 Historic town hall
 Jewish Synagogue – it houses the Judaica Museum of the Jewish Culture of the Slovak National Museum in Bratislava (one of the most beautiful synagogues in Slovakia)
 Neological synagogue on Konštantínova street
 Sancta Maria Institute – the seat of the gymasium on Konštantínova Street
 Kumšt - originally a bastion, rebuilt into the Vodárenská bastion, Jewish Museum (1929 - 1939), since 1947 under the administration of the Regional Museum in Prešov
 Blacksmith's bastion
 Franciscan Bastion
 Remains of the city fortifications
 Church of Donatus of Muenstereifel on Cemjata
 Neptune Fountain
 Jonas Záborský Theater
 Black Eagle Culture and Recreation Park
 Alexander Duchnovič Theater - Pulský Palace
 Dry mill
 Solivar National Cultural Monument
 Church of St. Stephen on Hrádku - Salt Castle (Castrum Salis), Solivar
 Water tower (currently a lookout tower), Táborisko
 Renaissance manor-house in Nižná Šebastová
 Parish Church of the Blessed Name of Jesus and Mary and Franciscan Monastery, Nižná Šebastová
 Statue of Christ in Rio de Janeiro on Trojica
 Statue of John Paul II
 Historic underground reservoir on Calvary

Castles 

Prešov has the largest number of preserved castle ruins among all the regional towns in its vicinity, which led to the creation of the Prešov Castle Road project in 2019. The aim was to connect these castles with an imaginary tourist line and thus support the development of tourism in Prešov and its surroundings. 6 castles took part in the Prešov Castle Road project, namely:

 Šariš Castle
 Kapušany Castle
 Zbojnícky Castle
 Lipov Castle
 Obišov Castle
 Šebeš Castle

Parks 

The construction of a central city park, situated between the Sekčov housing estate and Táborisko, is being prepared. In addition to the planned central city park, there are several parks and parks in Prešov:

Northern Park - near Trojica, there is a sculpture of the Immaculate Conception

 South Park – Hlavná Street, includes a monument to the liberators and the Neptune Fountain
 Garden of Art – Svätoplukova street
 Manor garden – Nižná Šebastová
 Kolman's garden
 Sculpture park by the amphitheater
 St. John of Nepomuk Park - Nižná Šebastová
 Legionary Square Park
 Park artillerymen's Lesík
 Čierny Most Park
 Sekčov Park
 Clementisova Park
 Youth Square Park
 Zabíjaná Lesopark
 Cemjata Lesopark
 Borkút Lesopark

Sports

Football
Prešov is home to one professional football team: 1. FC Tatran Prešov which is the oldest football team in Slovakia.

Ice hockey
The city's ice hockey club is HC 21 Prešov. Home arena of Prešov is ICE Arena and it has capacity of 5500 visitors. Prešov had hockey team since 1928 (HC Prešov Penguins) but in 2019 it has folded.

Handball
The city's handball club is HT Tatran Prešov which is Slovakia's most popular and currently most successful club. The handball team of Prešov is taking part not only in the Slovak league (where it is dominating), but also in the international SEHA League with the best handball teams from the region. Many handball players from this team are also members of the Slovak national handball team.

Other 

 City multipurpose sports hall
 Tatran Handball Arena (home stadium HT Tatran Prešov)
 Women's Handball Hall - Sídlisko II, by the river Torysa, near Kaufland
 ICE Arena (home stadium HC Prešov Penguins)
 University of Prešov Hall
 Velodrome Prešov
 Bike Center Prešov, Pumptrack and Dirt track, Sekčov

Regular events 

 Academic Prešov - student art festival
 Turbanfest - a festival of alternative music, theaters and workshops
 Prešov Music Spring (classical music concerts)
 Golden Barrel - a show of cartoonists from around the world
 Slovak Libraries Week
 Earth Day
 Evening run through Prešov
 Šariš hackathon
 Prešov Half Marathon
 Lear Run
 Tour de Prešov - cycling marathon
 Santa's run
 Santa's gift
 Salt day
 Salt Fair, connected with the International Museum Day
 The bobbin lace festival - the international participation of bobbins - lasts 1 week. The first days are the courses of bobbin lace and by the end of the week, the event itself is connected with the demonstration of bobbin and the sale of everything related to this technique
 Good festival
 Bad music festival
 Days of the city of Prešov
 Discovering Prešov
 Prešov Trinity Fair and festival of historical fencing and craft groups
 Prešov Cultural Summer
 Beer Festival - equestrian complex in Sídlisko III
 Muvina - wine show
 Church night
 Prešov markets and parkour races
 Prešov Music Autumn (classical music concerts)
 JAZZ Prešov - International Jazz Festival
 Jazz rock festival
 Súťaž mladých barmanov a čašníkov – EUROCUP
 IMAGE - Fashion Show
 Opal grain - business competition
 Gorazdov literary Prešov
 Farmers markets
 Prešov Student Liverpool - Young musical talents
 Christmas Salon - exhibition of Prešov artists
 Prešov Christmas Markets
 New Year's Eve - a joint celebration of the New Year
 Guitar Night
 Prešov likes to read

Economy and infrastructure

Industrial parks 
The following industrial parks and industrial zones are located in Prešov:
 Priemyselný park IPZ Prešov - Záborské (Industrial park IPZ Prešov - Záborské)
 CTPark Prešov south
 CTPark Prešov north
 Priemyselný park Záturecká (Záturecká Industrial park)
 Priemyselný park Grófske (Grófske Industrial park - under construction)
 Priemyselný areál Šalgovík (Šalgovík industrial area)
 Priemyselná zóna Budovateľská (Budovateľská Industrial zone)
 Priemyselná zóna Širpo (Širpo Industrial zone)
 Priemyselná zóna Delňa (Delňa Industrial zone)

Transport

Traffic 
Prešov is connected by the D1 motorway to the south with Košice, to the west with Poprad and Ružomberok. The completion of its connecting sections enabling motorway connections to Bratislava and Žilina is expected in 2024. A high-quality connection with Poland via Svidník and Hungary is to be provided by the R4 expressway.

Today, Prešov has a southwestern motorway bypass, which has been under construction since 2017 and was officially opened on October 28, 2021. The southwestern bypass of Prešov forms part of the D1 motorway in the section Prešov - west and Prešov - south. Since 2019, the 1st stage of the northern bypass from the Prešov - West (Vydumanec) junction to the Prešov - North (Dúbrava) junction, which will be part of the R4 expressway, has been under construction. After the overall construction, the Prešov motorway bypass will bypass the whole city, divert transit traffic in all directions and connect the D1 with the R4. It will start at D1 Prešov - South junction, continue towards the northwest, to the Prešov - West junction, there it will connect to the already completed parts of the D1 motorway, at this junction the R4 will connect to D1. Completion of the construction of the 1st stage (PO west-PO north) of the northern bypass R4 is planned for the summer of 2023 and the 2nd stage (PO north-PO east) is now under the tender with planned opening in 2027.

International routes of European importance E50 and E371, first class roads I/18, I/68 and I/20 and second class road 546 pass through Prešov. In 2017, the last stage of the so-called Embankment communication (Nábrežná komunikácia), including the reconstruction of the intersection at ZVL, which relieved the city center of transit traffic.

City transport 
Urban public transport is provided by the Transport Company of the City of Prešov (Dopravný podnik mesta Prešov, a. s.), which operates a total of 45 regular public transport lines by the following means of transport:

 trolleybuses (lines: 1, 2, 4, 5, 5D, 7, 8, 38)
 buses (daily lines: 10, 11, 12, 13, 14, 15, 16, 17, 18, 19, 20, 21, 22, 24, 25, 28, 29, 30, 32, 32A, 33, 34, 35, 36, 37, 38, 39, 41, 42, 43, 44, 45, 46, 48, nočné linky: N1, N2, N3)

Vehicle fleet MHD 
Today, the following vehicles are operated in MHD (Metská hromadná doprava - Public transport) Prešov:

 trolleybuses: Škoda 24 Tr Irisbus, Škoda 25 Tr Irisbus, Škoda 31 Tr SOR, Škoda 30 Tr SOR
 buses: Karosa B 941 / B 941E, Karosa B 961 / B 961E, Solaris Urbino 12, Karosa Irisbus Citybus 12M, Karosa Irisbus Citybus 18M, Irisbus Citelis 12M, Irisbus Citelis 18M, Iveco First FCLLI, SOR NB 12 City, SOR NB 18 City, Solaris Urbino 18, Irisbus Crossway LE 12M, SOR BN 10.5 (leased from DPB)

History of public transport 

The history of public transport in Prešov began in 1949, when Local Transport was established, a municipal enterprise of the city of Prešov as the operator of regular public transport in the territory of Prešov. After the end of World War II, it was not possible to start public transport with a new vehicle fleet, so an offer was accepted for the purchase of older Tatra vehicles from public transport facilities in Prague, Plzeň and Bratislava. The vehicles were initially parked in the courtyard of the old prison on Konštantínova Street, where the company was also located. On September 4, 1949, the traffic on the first lines was ceremoniously opened. Already in the first year of operation, the Prešov public transport buses went beyond the city limits to the municipalities of Šarišské Lúky, Nižná Šebastová, Haniska and Solivar. The following year, the development of public transport continued with the introduction of additional bus lines. The state hospital, Záhrady, Sídlisko II, Budovateľská and Čapajevova street were gradually connected to the public transport network in the 1950s, as well as other municipalities: the town of Veľký Šariš and its part Kanaš, Malý Šariš, Ľubotice, Fintice, Teriakovce and Záborské. In 1959, the first night line began operating and the company was located on its own premises on Petrovanská Street, where it moved in 1951. The year 1958, when the construction of the trolleybus network in the city was approved, brought a new stage in the development of urban transport. All high-capacity intra-city lines were to be electrified, while bus transport was to remain ancillary. Line 1 Was the first to be electrified, which led from Nižná Šebastová through Šarišské Lúky to Solivar. Although its construction was delayed by several technical problems, on May 13, 1962, passengers got to experience trolleybuses. A new depot for trolleybuses and buses was completed in Šarišské Lúky, where the entire vehicle fleet as well as the company's administration moved. Work on other sections soon began, so in 1966 trolleybuses were already running on Košická, Sabinovská and Budovateľská streets. and Gottwald today 17 Novembra Street. In the first half of the 1970s, the track along Sabinovská Street was extended to Dúbrava and trolleybuses also began to serve industrial Širpo. Other projects of lines to Sídlisko III, Šváby, Haniska and Delňa could no longer be carried out. Under the influence of cheap oil, buses also began to gain ground in Prešov. Bus transport recorded a quantitative development, when buses also started to run to Táborisko, Šidlovec, Cemjata, on Pod Kamennou baňou Street and Sídlisko III. In terms of quality, however, this mode of transport has struggled with constant difficulties such as the lack of vehicles, their low capacity and breakdown. These shortcomings were not gradually overcome until the late 1970s. Nevertheless, due to the non-construction of the trolleybus line to Sídlisko III, the service of which was crucial at that time, the buses fully prevailed. The period of the turn of the 1970s and 1980s, when the possibilities of public transport were significantly limited by the lack of fuel, pointed to the suitability of trolleybus transport. Following a review at government level, the electrification program was re-launched. Sídlisko III was the first to be connected to the trolleybus transport network (1985). Trolleybuses achieved a majority share in public transport in the city of Prešov after 1992, when trolleybus transport was introduced to the largest housing estate Sekčov. The issue of the tariff in Prešov has always been characterized by an ever-changing number of tariff bands, on the basis of which the rates for individual journeys were set. In 1949, there were three fare zones, and it was possible to change to another vehicle on one ticket. In 1969, single-ticket transfers were canceled and the number of bands was reduced to two. Since 1984, the government's acreage has simplified the tariff and there has been no division of the network into bands. Different fares for travel to neighboring municipalities were reintroduced in 1993 and existed until 1996. Special rates also applied in 1997 – 99 and again in 2000. Tickets were originally bought from the guide directly in the vehicle, later sold by the driver, respectively a ticketing machine was installed in the vehicle. In 1977, the sale of tickets outside the vehicle was introduced. Since 1995, it is again possible to buy a ticket from the driver, but at an increased price. Public transport is improved by the gradual renewal of the vehicle fleet, focused on low-floor vehicles, the introduction of computer technology into traffic management as well as the reconstruction of track sections of the trolleybus track and overhauls of vehicles. In the future, it is planned to expand ecological trolleybus transport to the Šváby housing estate and the second connection of the city center and the Sekčov housing estate along Rusínská Street.

Rail transport 
Three railway lines Košice - Muszyna with a connection to Poland, the line Prešov - Humenné and Prešov - Bardejov pass through the city. In 2007, the main railway station in Prešov was modernized, and in 2019, the pre-station area was reconstructed, including the underpass under Masarykova Street, as well as MHD (Public transport) stops.

The following railway stations and stops are located in Prešov:

 Prešov railway station – Main station
 Prešov Railway stop – Old Town
 Šarišské Lúky railway station
 Prešov Railway station – Nižná Šebastová

As part of the integrated transport project, the construction of other railway stops in the city is also planned.

Bus transport 
The main bus transport operator in the Prešov self-governing region is the company SAD Prešov, a.s., which provides suburban, long-distance and international transport. Suburban transport is performed on 63 bus lines serving the districts of Prešov, Bardejov, Sabinov, Svidník, Košice surroundings, Košice, Vranov nad Topľou, Stropkov, Stará Ľubovňa and Levoča. The main transport terminal in Prešov within the bus service is the Prešov Bus Station. SAD Prešov, a.s. in addition to the performance of suburban, long-distance and international transport,also ensures the performance of public transport in Bardejov.

Air Transport 
There is currently no public civil airport in Prešov. There is an air base in the Nižná Šebastová district.

Bicycle transport 
The international cycle route of European significance EuroVelo 11 leads through the functional territory of the city of Prešov, which passes through the cadastres of the municipalities of Veľký Šariš, Prešov, Haniska and Kendice. The route is a part of the General Cycling Route as branch H1 - the main cycling route and belongs to the strategic goals of the Prešov self-governing region, as the main axis of the region. V súčasnosti je v rámci EuroVelo 11 prevádzke súvislá cyklotrasa v trase Wilec hôrka - Mestská hala - Sídlisko II - Sídlisko III - Veľký Šariš - Šarišské Michaľany. Súčasťou tejto trasy je aj cyklomost pod Šarišským hradom s historickým vzhľadom, ktorý sa stal novou vyhľadávanou atrakciou. A part of this route is also a bicycle bridge under the Šariš Castle with a historical look, which has become a new sought-after attraction. Another important cycling route is the so-called a cycle railway leading from Solivar in Prešov to the Sigord recreational area. In addition to these important cycle routes, there are a number of other local cycle routes in Prešov in various parts of the city. So far, the newest cycle routes in Prešov are the cycle route on Masarykova Street, completed in 2019 and the Mlynský náhon cycle route, completed in 2020. Their completion was ensured by the cycling connection of Sídlisko III with the city center and with the Sekčov and Šváby housing estates. In 2020, a new cycle route was also completed at the Sekčov housing estate on the route from Laca Novomeského Street to Šalgovík. For lovers of mountain biking, there are Prešov singletracks available in the Prešov forests, which together form eight routes of varying difficulty with a total length of approximately 20 km (12.4 mi). Prešov singletracks are one of the most attractive cycling areas in Prešov and its surroundings. They are well marked and maintained in excellent condition. The routes lead through Malkovská hôrka, to the recreation center Cemjata (Kyslá and Kvašná voda), to Borkút and it is also possible to get to the Calvary in Prešov.

Healthcare 
The largest providers of health care in Prešov are the following public and private facilities:

 University Hospital with J. A. Raiman Polyclinic Prešov (Fakultná nemocnica s poliklinikou J. A. Raimana Prešov)
 Military hospital (Vojenská nemocnica)
 Oáza General Hospital (Všeobecná nemocnica Oáza)
 Polyclinic Prešov (Poliklinika Prešov)
 Polyclinic ProCare Prešov (Poliklinika ProCare Prešov)
 St. Elizabeth Hospital
 Analytical-diagnostic laboratory and outpatient clinics (Analyticko-diagnostické laboratórium a ambulancie (AdLa))
 Sofyc Clinic - one-day surgery clinic (Sofyc Clinic - klinika jednodňovej chirurgie)
 Gynstar - one-day care in the field of gynecology and obstetrics (Gynstar - jednodňová starostlivosť v odbore gynekológia a pôrodníctvo)

In addition to these facilities, medical services are also provided by other smaller clinics and health centers.

Education
Institutions of tertiary education in the city are the University of Prešov with 12,600 students, including 867 doctoral students, and the private International Business College ISM Slovakia in Prešov, with 455 students. In addition, the Faculty of Manufacturing Technologies of the Technical University of Košice is based in the city.

There are 15 public primary schools, six private primary schools and two religious primary schools. Overall, they enroll 9,079 pupils. The city's system of secondary education consists of 10 gymnasia with 3,675 students, 4 specialized high schools with 5,251 students and 11 vocational schools with 5,028 students.

Business
There are several business (shopping) centers in Prešov. EPERIA Shopping Mall has taken its name according to historic city name Eperies. It is located at the river bank Sekčov, between the "Hobby park" at the west side (with DIY chain store HORNBACH) and STOP-SHOP point from south side. Total shopping area of all three units is approximately 140.000 sq m. Recently new-opened Shopping Mall NOVUM in the very heart of city centre with 33.000 sq. m is the second largest. There are also ZOC-Max Prešov SC, ZOC Koral, Solivaria SC and close Lubotice Retail Park. with an additional area together of cca 40.000 sq. m.

One of the most favorite popular locations in Prešov is Plaza Beach Resort. It is an exotic place in a cozy and calm city area, consisting of a luxury hotel with a restaurant and outside swimming pools. The resort has been built in a Mediterranean style.

Hiking trails

 European walking route E8
 Prešov – Miháľov – Kurimka – Dukla – Iwonicz-Zdrój – Rymanów-Zdrój – Puławy – Tokarnia (778 m) – Kamień (717 m) – Komańcza – Cisna – Ustrzyki Górne – Tarnica – Wołosate

Twin towns – sister cities

Prešov is twinned with:

 Brugherio,  Italy
 Gabrovo, Bulgaria
 Keratsini,  Greece
 La Courneuve, France
 Mukachevo,  Ukraine
 Nowy Sącz, Poland
 Nyíregyháza, Hungary
 Pittsburgh,  United States
 Prague 10 (Prague), Czech Republic
 Remscheid, Germany
 Rishon LeZion,  Israel

Panorama

Gallery

Bibliography

 
 
 Official History of Prešov
 Prešov town hall (July 2002), Prešov - city profile. Retrieved in June 2004 from http://www.pis.sk/jpis/obsah/html/presov_profile.htm.

See also 

 List of people from Prešov
 University of Prešov
 Executive Court of Prešov
 Šariš Brewery

Notes

References

External links
 Official website
 DPMP - Public Transport Official Site

 
Cities and towns in Slovakia
Šariš